Genelle is both a surname and a given name. Notable people with the name include:

Kim Genelle (born 1956), American fashion model and actress
Richard Genelle (1961–2008), American entrepreneur and actor
Genelle Williams (born 1984), Canadian actress